Hauff is a surname. Notable people with the surname include:

Angelika Hauff (1922–1983), Austrian actress
Paul Hauff (born 1970), Australian rugby league footballer
Reinhard Hauff (born 1939), German film director
Wilhelm Hauff (1802–1827), German poet and novelist
Helena Hauff, German DJ and Music Producer